Franz Kälin (born 24 September 1939) is a Swiss cross-country skier. He competed at the 1964 Winter Olympics and the 1968 Winter Olympics.

References

External links
 

1939 births
Living people
Swiss male cross-country skiers
Olympic cross-country skiers of Switzerland
Cross-country skiers at the 1964 Winter Olympics
Cross-country skiers at the 1968 Winter Olympics
People from Einsiedeln
Sportspeople from the canton of Schwyz